The Montana Grizzlies basketball team represents the University of Montana in men's college basketball.  They compete at the NCAA Division I level and are members of the Big Sky Conference. Home games are played at Dahlberg Arena located inside the University of Montana's Adams Center.

Postseason results

NCAA tournament results
The Grizzlies have appeared in 12 NCAA tournaments, with a combined record of 2–13.

NIT results
The Grizzlies have appeared in four National Invitation Tournaments. Their combined record is 0–4.

CBI results
The Grizzlies have appeared in two College Basketball Invitationals (CBI). Their combined record is 0–2.

Career leaders

Points

Rebounds

Assists

Steals

Blocks

Season by season records

References

External links